Tate Publishing is a publisher of visual arts books, associated with the Tate Gallery in London, England. It was established in 1911; nowadays it is a division of Tate Enterprises Ltd, an independent company wholly owned by the Trustees of Tate, and is based at Tate Britain, Millbank, London. In 2001, it produced 30 new book titles and had gross sales of £4 million, a large increase over previous years due to the opening of the Tate Modern branch of the Tate Gallery.

References

External links 
 Tate Publishing website

British companies established in 1911
Publishing companies established in 1911
Book publishing companies of the United Kingdom
Companies based in the City of Westminster
Tate galleries
Visual arts publishing companies
1911 establishments in England
1911 in art